was a Japanese manga series written and illustrated by Yōko Tamotsu.  The manga has inspired a novelization by Masumi Suzuki, and an anime television series adaptation by Liden Films aired from April 7 to June 23, 2019.  The anime series is licensed in North America under a Crunchyroll-Funimation partnership. The series follows Arata Miyako, a newly recruited staff member of the Shinjuku Ward Nocturnal Community Relations Division (NCRD) who possesses the "Ears of Sand", giving him the ability to understand the languages of supernatural creatures called the Anothers. His main role with the Shinjuku Ward NCRD is to maintain relations with the Anothers.

Characters
 

Arata is the newly recruited staff member of the Shinjuku Ward Nocturnal Community Relations Division (NCRD). He is a descendant of and resembles his ancestor Abe no Seimei. He possesses the "Ears of Sand", giving him the ability to understand the languages of the Anothers.
 

Kyōichi is the shift leader of the Shinjuku Ward NCRD.
 

Theo is a longtime staff member of the Shinjuku Ward NCRD. He is half-British and half-Japanese. He designs and creates a lot of the materials and tools used by Shinjuku Ward NCRD and other prefecture divisions.
 

Senda is the head of the Shinjuku Ward NCRD.

Satoru is a member of the Tokyo Metropolitan Nocturnal, Cultural and Environmental Department. He has a scar on his left eyebrow. He is a ruthless realist who despises Anothers and chooses to eliminate or neutralize them.
 / 

Huehuecóyotl (The Old Coyote) is an Aztec god of music and dance, but they are also a trickster god who created chaos. Their gender is unknown. They were renamed Kohaku (Amber) after a black fox by Abe no Seimei.
 

Yuki is an Another in the form of a nekomata, a feline creature with two tails. He takes the form of a white cat with blue eyes. He was tasked with guarding the storehouse at Miyako's family home by one of Arata's ancestors. He was a playmate of Arata when he was a child.

Media

Manga
Yōko Tamotsu launched the manga in Kadokawa Shoten's shōjo manga magazine Monthly Asuka on May 23, 2015 and ended it on February 22, 2022. The manga is also serialized online on Kadokawa's Comic Newtype magazine.

Novel
A novelization by Masumi Suzuki was published by Kadokawa under their Kadokawa Horror Bunko label on July 24, 2018.

Anime
An anime television series adaptation was announced on June 21, 2018. The series is directed by Tetsuya Watanabe and written by Tatsuto Higuchi, with animation by studio Liden Films. Eriko Itō is designing the characters. The series aired from April 7 to June 23, 2019 on Tokyo MX, SUN, BS11, KBS, and TVA. Jun Fukuyama performed the series' opening theme song "dis-communicate", while Shunichi Toki performed the series' ending theme song "Yakusoku no Overture". A two-episode OVA titled "Hitori Bocchi no Kyūketsuki" was bundled with the series' Blu-ray release on September 25, 2019.  An original animation DVD was released on November 22, 2019, bundled with the 12th manga volume.

Notes

References

External links
  
  
 

2019 anime television series debuts
2018 Japanese novels
Anime series based on manga
Crunchyroll anime
Funimation
Kadokawa Dwango franchises
Kadokawa Shoten manga
Liden Films
Shōjo manga
Urban fantasy anime and manga
Tokyo MX original programming